Effluxion is the fifth studio album by American band Telekinesis. It was released on February 22, 2019 through Merge Records.

Track listing

References

2019 albums
Merge Records albums